Frank McRae (3 August 1927 – 2007) was an Australian rules footballer who played with Footscray in the Victorian Football League (VFL).

Notes

External links 
		

1927 births
Australian rules footballers from Victoria (Australia)
Western Bulldogs players
2007 deaths